Hacqueville is a French commune. It might also refer to:

Charles de Hacqueville, French bishop
Guillaume de Léon, sire de Hacqueville